Barbizon Modeling and Acting School is an international modeling and acting school headquartered in Tampa, Florida that provides instructional courses in the domain of modeling and personal development.

History
The first Barbizon School of Modeling and Acting was opened in 1939 on Fifth Avenue in New York City, New York, by Helen Fraser, a fashion model and teacher with her husband, Dr. Fraser, a dentist. The Barbizon name was developed from the Fraser's vacations to France where they became interested in the town of Barbizon, a village outside of Paris known for the 19th-century Barbizon school of painters. She wrote a book Assignment in Modeling: A Guide to a Career in Fashion and Photographic Modeling".

In 1950, Helen met Ronald Reagan, who would later become President of the United States, and awarded him with the Best-Dressed Man in America award she established. In 1951, Helen acted as a celebrity judge for the Miss Brooklyn Pageant, alongside actress Denise Darcel and comedian Steve Allen.

Locations
Barbizon Modeling and Acting Centers are located in more than 200 markets across the United States. International locations include Bangkok, Toronto, Santo Domingo and Japan.

College scholarship
In 1992, Barbizon began a college scholarship program, paying up to $100,000 of tuition for the scholarship recipients to any college or university in the United States.

Notable alumni

 Nicole Gale Anderson – appears as Macy in the Disney Channel television series JONAS; also appears in the ABC Family television film Princess David Archuleta – won second place on the seventh season of American Idol Moisés Arias – appears as Rico on the Disney Channel television series Hannah Montana; appears in the films Nacho Libre, The Perfect Game, and the television film Dadnapped 
 Drew Tyler Bell – appears as Thomas Forrester on the CBS television soap opera The Bold and the Beautiful; also appears in the films The Seeker and Jeepers Creepers 2 Haley Bennett – appears in the films Music and Lyrics, Arcadia Lost, Marley and Me, College, and The Haunting of Molly Hartley Caressa Cameron – crowned Miss America in 2010
 Carmen Electra – thanks Barbizon in her self-help book; has appeared in films including Meet the Spartans and Epic Movie Sean Faris – appears in the films Never Back Down, Forever Strong, and The Glass Eye; has appeared in various television shows, including The Vampire Diaries, Reunion, Life as We Know It, and Smallville Lyndsy Fonseca – appears in the ABC television series Desperate Housewives; also appears on other television series, including as House, How I Met Your Mother, Heroes, and Big Love Julie Henderson chosen as one of the 2007 Sports Illustrated Swimsuit models; has also appeared on covers of Vogue and Elle June Kirby - actress and model
 Gena Lee Nolin – named Miss Barbizon
 Condoleezza Rice – first female African-American U.S. Secretary of State; referenced Barbizon in her autobiography as one of her early stepping stones
 Zach Roerig – appears as Matt in the CW-TV television series The Vampire Diaries; has had roles on several soap operas, including One Life to Live, As the World Turns, and The Guiding Light Sofia Vassilieva – appears as Ariel Dubois on the television series Medium; appears as the character Eloise in all of the Disney Eloise films; appears as Cindy Brady in the television film The Brady Bunch in the White House; appears opposite Cameron Diaz in the film My Sister's Keeper''
 Ryan Phillippe has starred in many films including I Know What You Did Last Summer, Cruel Intentions and Gosford Park. Recently, Ryan starred on the hit TV show Secrets & Lies.
 Patricia Ashley hosted her own Disney Channel Show, Gotcha Covered, and has had roles in film and TV including Nefas: The Wicked, iCarly, The Neighbors and more.
 Giuliana Rancic, host of E! News and interviewer for Live from the Red Carpet events.
 Audrey Marie Anderson- has had roles in many popular TV shows including The Unit, Arrow and The Walking Dead.
 Tera Patrick- is an American pornographic actress and model who is the Penthouse Pet of the Month for February 2000 and is an inductee for the NightMoves, AVN and XRCO Halls of Fame.

See also

 Lists of schools

References

  in Tampa, Florida

1939 establishments in New York City
Drama schools in the United States
Fifth Avenue
Modeling (profession)
Universities and colleges in Manhattan
Educational institutions established in 1939
Vocational schools in the United States